Ilir Jaçellari is an Albanian actor, painter and photographer. Ilir is best known for his roles in ACAB – All Cops Are Bastards and Balancing Act.

Biography
Ilir Jaçellari was born in Lushnje, Albania on 7 July 1970. His first studies were in painting and acting with teaching personalities such as Faslli Haliti and Gjergj Lala. His first shows were presented in his city of birth. Ilir is son of famous Albanian writer Halil Jaçellari.

Filmography

References

External links

Albanian male film actors
Albanian painters
1970 births
Living people
People from Lushnjë